Gerbathodes is a genus of moths of the family Noctuidae. The genus was described by Warren in 1911.

Species
Gerbathodes angusta (Butler, 1879) Japan
Gerbathodes paupera (Staudinger, 1892) Amurland, Korea, Japan, Taiwan

References

Acronictinae